This is a list of films produced in, set in, or related to Guadeloupe, in alphabetical order.

See also
 Cinema of the Caribbean

External links
 Guadeloupean film at the Internet Movie Database

Lists of films by country of production
Films
Guadeloupe-related lists